Synthetic rescue (or synthetic recovery or synthetic viability when a lethal phenotype is rescued ) refers to a genetic interaction in which a cell that is nonviable, sensitive to a specific drug, or otherwise impaired due to the presence of a genetic mutation becomes viable when the original mutation is combined with a second mutation in a different gene. The second mutation can either be a loss-of-function mutation (equivalent to a knockout) or a gain-of-function mutation.

Synthetic rescue could potentially be exploited for gene therapy, but it also provides information on the function of the genes involved in the interaction.

Types of genetic suppression

Dosage-mediated suppression
Dosage-mediated suppression occurs when the suppression of the mutant phenotype is mediated by the over expression of a second suppressor gene. This can occur when the initial mutations destabilize a protein-protein interaction and over expression of the interacting protein bypass the negative effect of the initial mutation.

Interaction-mediated suppression
Interaction-mediated suppression occurs when a deleterious mutation in a component of a protein complex destabilizes the complex. A compensatory mutation in another component of the protein complex can then suppress the deleterious phenotype by re-establishing the interaction between the two proteins. It usually means that the deleterious mutation and the suppressive mutation occurs in two residues that are closely located in the tridimensional structure of the multi-protein complex. As thus, this kind of suppression provides indirect information on the molecular structure of the proteins involved.

Experimental observation of theoretical prediction
The strongest form of synthetic rescues, in which the deleterious impact of a gene knockout is mitigated by an additional genetic perturbation that is also deleterious when considered in isolation, was modeled and predicted theoretically for gene interactions mediated by the metabolic network. 
This strong form of synthetic rescue has been recently observed in experiments in both Saccharomyces cerevisiae.
and Escherichia coli.
Patient survival analysis was also shown to predict synthetic rescues and other types of interactions.

tRNA-mediated suppression
Genetic suppression can be mediated by tRNA genes when a mutation alters their anticodon sequence. For example, a tRNA designated for the recognition of the codon TCA and the corresponding insertion of serine in the growing polypeptide chain can mutate so that it recognize a TAA stop codon and promote the insertion of serine instead of the termination of the polypeptide chain. This could be particularly useful when a nonsense mutation (TCA >TAA) prevents the expression of a gene by either leading to a partially completed polypeptide or degradation of the mRNA by nonsense-mediated decay. The redundancy of tRNA genes makes sure that such mutation would not prevent the normal insertion of serines when the TCA codon specifies them.

See also
Complex networks
Gene therapy
Suppressor mutation
Synthetic lethality

References

Genetics
Gene therapy